The Tippecanoe River is a gentle,  river in the Central Corn Belt Plains ecoregion in northern Indiana. The name "Tippecanoe" was derived from a Miami-Illinois word for buffalo fish, reconstructed as */kiteepihkwana/ or as kiteepihkwana siipiiwi.

It supports more numerous imperiled species and overall species diversity than most streams of the upper Midwest. The Nature Conservancy has identified it as one of the top ten rivers in the United States to preserve due to its ecological diversity and the high proportion of endangered species found in it.

Course
The Tippecanoe River originates from multiple kettle lakes formed by ancient glaciers in what is now Noble County, Indiana. Numerous dams were built along its length, to create lakes and ponds for water power. The river flows west into Wilmot Pond, which is formed by a small dam on its western side.  After Wilmot, it crosses into Kosciusko County and enters Backwaters Lake, the basin of Webster Lake.  After going over the dam at Webster Lake, the river travels a few miles and enters Tippecanoe Lake. From there the river flows south and west through the southeast corner of Marshall County, then bends northwest through the northern part of Fulton County and through Pulaski County, from the northeast corner to the south central portion, traversing Tippecanoe River State Park along the way. It enters White County, where dams form Lake Freeman and Lake Shafer. The river exits Lake Freeman from the south and flows through the west part of Carroll County into Tippecanoe County, where it joins the Wabash River. 

In addition to Tippecanoe County, five townships through which the river flows are named Tippecanoe:
Tippecanoe Township, Carroll County, Indiana
Tippecanoe Township, Kosciusko County, Indiana
Tippecanoe Township, Marshall County, Indiana
Tippecanoe Township, Pulaski County, Indiana
Tippecanoe Township, Tippecanoe County, Indiana

History
The Battle of Tippecanoe, in which Governor William Henry Harrison defeated the Indian confederacy of Tecumseh, occurred near the south bank of the river. Modern Lafayette developed near this site.

Aquatic Life
The Upper Tippecanoe River continues to have habitat suitable for unionid (freshwater mussel) species. The rivershed has retained much of its natural condition, continuing to provide a high quality habitat for freshwater mussels. Surveys done since 1903 show that the waterway continues to support 
57 species of mussels. Modern changes in the surrounding land use and dredging the river channel affect the silt levels and stream flow, which threaten the mussel populations. Of the existing species, several are state listed as endangered, including the northern riffleshell (Epioblasma Torulosa rangiana), the wavyrayed lampmussel (Lampsilis fasciola), the kidneyshell (Ptychobranchus fasciolaris), and the purple lilliput ([[Toxolasma
|Toxolasma lividus]]) The clubshell (Pleurobema clava) is a federally endangered specie.

The river fishery is similar to the early 1900s, even with the changes in river use and the increase in urban and agricultural use. Survey's done in the early 21st century found representatives of 14 families and 54 species of fishes. Nearly 80% of collected fish are game fish species, including: Largemouth bass (Micropterus salmoides), Yellow perch (Perca flavescens), Walleye (Stizostedion vitreum), Muskellunge (Esox masquinongy), Bluegill (Lepomis macrochirus), Channel catfish (Ictalurus punctatus), Rainbow trout (Oncorhynchus mykiss), White and Black crappie (Pomoxis annularis and P. nigromaculatus), Longear sunfish (Lepomis megalotis), Northern pike (Esox lucius), Rock bass (Ambloplites rupestris), White bass (Morone chrysops) and Warmouth (Lepomis gulosus). Bluegills were the dominant fish, being 50% of the river population.

Dams
In the 1920s, two dams were built along the Tippecanoe River to produce electricity.
Oakdale Hydro Plant, built in 1925, created Lake Freeman. It provides 9.2 MW of power through NiSource.
Norway Hydro Plant, built in 1925, created Lake Shafer. It provides 7.2 MW of power through NiSource.

See also
List of Indiana rivers

References

External links
The Nature Conservancy Tippecanoe River Project

The Watershed Foundation

Rivers of Indiana
Tributaries of the Wabash River
Rivers of Noble County, Indiana
Rivers of Kosciusko County, Indiana
Rivers of Carroll County, Indiana
Rivers of Marshall County, Indiana
Rivers of Fulton County, Indiana
Rivers of Pulaski County, Indiana
Rivers of Tippecanoe County, Indiana
Rivers of White County, Indiana